Eucalyptus cloeziana, commonly known as Gympie messmate or dead finish, is a species of tree that is endemic to Queensland. It has rough, flaky to fibrous bark on its trunk, smooth bark above, lance-shaped to curved adult leaves that are much paler on the lower side, flower buds in groups of seven, white flowers and hemispherical fruit.

Description
It has thick, rough, fibrous to flaky, brownish to grey bark on the trunk and smooth grey to orange bark on the branches. The leaves are dull green and a much lighter shade on the lower side. Flowering occurs in December and January and the flowers are white.

Taxonomy and naming
Eucalyptus cloeziana was first formally described in 1878 by Ferdinand von Mueller from a specimen collected near Rockingham Bay by John Dallachy. The description was published in Fragmenta phytographiae Australiae. The specific epithet (cloeziana) honours François Stanislas Cloez who identified cineole as the major constituent of eucalyptus oil.

Distribution and habitat
Gympie messmate has a widespread but scattered distribution in Queensland, particularly from east of Tambo to Mundubbera and Gympie, and from west of Townsville to north-west of Cooktown with isolated occurrences in between. It grows in open forest and woodland on tablelands and slopes and is often the dominant species of tree.

References

cloeziana
Myrtales of Australia
Trees of Australia
Flora of Queensland
Plants described in 1878
Taxa named by Ferdinand von Mueller